FCUK: Father Chitti Umaa Kaarthik is a 2021 Indian Telugu-language comedy film directed by Vidyasagar Raju and produced by KL Damodar Prasad through Sri Ranjith Movies. It stars Jagapathi Babu, Ram Karthik, Ammu Abhirami, Baby Saharshitha. The music is composed by Bheems Ceciroleo. Jagapathi Babu played the lead role after a long gap.

Plot 
Fhani Bhupal is a successful businessman and owner of a condom company who is known for his womanizing ways. His son, Karthik, is a flirt and runs a bridal grooming agency. Despite their different personalities, Fhani and Karthik share a close bond. Uma is a pediatrician who is engaged to a foreign-educated man named Ph.D. Pathuri Hanumantha Das. Although Ph.D. lacks experience in relationships, he agrees to the match as Uma's traditional family is beneficial for his thesis. 

At a rave, Uma's friend Priyanka mocks her for not attracting men. Uma bets that she can lure Karthik, but he ends up genuinely falling in love with her after she reveals the truth. However, when Uma misunderstands Karthik's intentions and chides him, he seeks revenge by demanding three days of dates, which Uma agrees to. Eventually, Uma discovers Karthik's true feelings for her, but their relationship is complicated by their engagement to other people.

When Fhani is hospitalized, Karthik rushes to the hospital, not realizing he is naked, and is surprised to learn that Fhani has a daughter named Chitti with a prostitute named Kalyani. After Kalyani dies, Fhani takes care of Chitti. Despite some initial conflict between Fhani and Karthik, Karthik develops a strong bond with Chitti.

One night, Karthik neglects Chitti when he is drunk, and she becomes dehydrated and collapses. When Uma witnesses Karthik's genuine love for the child, she begins to understand him better. The next day, Uma invites Karthik to her wedding, but both of them realize they have feelings for each other. Uma invites Karthik to her village, where she introduces him as a widowed friend and Chitti as his daughter. Although Uma's father disapproves of the situation, Fhani pleads with him and ultimately convinces him to accept Karthik.

When Ph.D. becomes suspicious of Uma's fidelity, he calls off the wedding. Uma's father tries to arrange a marriage between Uma and Karthik, but the truth about Chitti's parentage causes conflict between the families. Karthik becomes estranged from his father and sister, but after Fhani makes a heartfelt plea to Uma's family, they reconcile and accept Karthik. The movie ends happily with Karthik and Uma getting married.

Cast  

Jagapathi Babu as Fhani Bhupal
Ram Karthik as Karthik
Ammu Abhirami as Umaa
 Baby Saharshitha as Chitti
 Raghu Master as Cameo
Daggubati Raja as Raghavaiah Uma's father
Kalyani Natarajan as Uma's mother
Ketaki Narayan as Kalyani
Aneri Vajani as Priyanka
Master Bharath as Ph.D. (Pathuri Hanumantha Das)
Shankar Melkote as Melkotaiah, Ph.D.'s grandfather
Rajitha
Ali
Brahmaji as Fhani's friend
Krishna Bhagavaan 
Sri Lakshmi as Servant Andhallu
Jayalalita as Judge
Ananth as Lawyer
Vasu Inturi as Lawyer
Jabardast Ram Prasad

Reception  
The film released to mixed reviews from the audience and negative reviews from critics. A critic from The Times of India opined that “Overall, despite a good story about that deals with the orthodox nature of society, FCUK fails to make a mark. Watch at your own risk!”. Telangana Today criticized the film while praising the performance of Raam Karthik. A critic from The New Indian Express wrote that “what we get on screen is just a farcical drama”. A critic from 123Telugu said that "FCUK is a bold movie narrated in a boring manner".

References

External links 

2021 films
2020s Telugu-language films
2021 comedy films
Indian comedy films
Films set in Hyderabad, India
Films shot in Hyderabad, India
Films scored by Bheems Ceciroleo